Joannes Theodorus Wamelink (10 November 1827 in Aalten, Gelderland, the Netherlands – 31 December 1900), was a prominent musician and composer in Cleveland, Ohio.

Emigration to Cleveland
In 1835, Wamelink and his family, father Hermanus Wamelink and mother  Maria Johanna Francisca De Reuwer Wamelink emigrated to Cleveland, Ohio, with his eight siblings. Wamelink as a youth of fourteen, became the first organist of St. Mary of the Flats Catholic Church. When the superstructure of the cathedral was completed, a new organ was installed, which the Cleveland Herald of that time refers to as the finest in the district.

For a period, Wamelink moved to Pittsburgh, Pennsylvania and while there worked as a composer in conjunction with Charles B. Barr. In 1853 Wamelink married Catherine Sweetland, of Pittsburgh then returned with her to Cleveland, where he continued to work in music.

Years in Cleveland, Ohio
Upon his return to Cleveland, Wamelink opened a piano shop on Superior St. He continued as a composer, music, and voice teacher, and for nearly 30 years was the organist at St. John's Cathedral in Cleveland. He was the founder of the Haydn Society; the first musical society in Cleveland and served as its director for many years. He died on 31 Dec 1900, and is interred in the St. John's Cemetery.  The City of Cleveland named a street near University Circle after Wamelink.

Musical Compositions
Wamelink composed many pieces of music, a number of which are found in the collections of: The Library of Congress, The Carnegie Library in Pittsburgh, Stanford University, the Rutherford B. Hayes Presidential Center, Washington State University, and the Penn Libraries, among others. His compositions include:

First Mass in C, Ave Maria
Central Skating Park Polka
Skating Rink Waltz
Sweetbrier Polka Mazurka, 1854
Homewood Polka Mazurka, 1855
O Sing That Melody Again, 1858
The Queen Rose, 1859
Col J. B. Clark's Return, 1862
Sanitary Fair Grand March, 1864
Liberty and Union, 1864
Dying Soldier Boy, 1864
Petroleum Is King, 1865
Wild Bird's Song, 1865
President Lincoln's Funeral March, 1865
We'll March Once More, My Boys, 1872
United, in 1874 Roses, 1874
Col. Clark's Grand Triumphant March, 1875
The Veterans of '76, 1876.

External links
 CLPGH.org
 
 
 
 
 
 
 CDLIB.org

1827 births
1900 deaths
American male composers
American organists
American male organists
Dutch emigrants to the United States
People from Aalten
Musicians from Cleveland
19th-century American composers
19th-century male musicians
19th-century American businesspeople
19th-century organists